Martha Callison Horst is an American composer. Her music has been performed by Earplay, Alea III, the Empyrean Ensemble, the Fromm Players, Left Coast Ensemble, Dal Niente, Composers, Inc., members of the Scottish Chamber Orchestra, the Chicago Composers Consortium, and Music Beyond Performance: SoundImageSound V. Horst studied composition at Stanford University and the University of California, Davis. She is currently Professor of Composition and Music Theory in the Wonsook Kim College of Fine Arts at Illinois State University. Furthermore, she serves as an Academic Senator representing the College of Fine Arts. In the fall of 2020, she was elected Secretary of the Academic Senate placing her on the Executive Committee with the University administration.

Partial list of works 

 Adagio for orchestra
 Cloister Songs
 Cloud Gate
 Creature Studies
 Giant Variations
 Night Songs
 Sonata No. 1 for piano
 Straussian Landscapes
 Threads
 Three Meditations on Van Gogh
 Widening Gyre

Discography

References

External links

1967 births
Living people
21st-century American composers
American women composers
University of California, Davis alumni
21st-century American women musicians
21st-century women composers
Illinois State University faculty
21st-century classical composers